Shavaughn Ruakere (born 3 March 1978) is a New Zealand Māori actress and television presenter. She is best known for her role as presenter on the children's TV show What Now. Shavaughn also played the role of Roimata Ngatai on the prime-time soap opera Shortland Street.

Early life
Ruakere was born in Hāwera but lived in Ōpunake until her family moved to New Plymouth when she was eight years old. She attended university in Auckland before relocating to Christchurch for a television presenter role on What Now.

Career
Ruakere started out as a presenter for popular children's television shows such as What Now in New Zealand in the late nineties and later on  ITV''' s SMTV Live in 2003. Her acting career began with minor roles in the films River Queen (2005) and Sione's Wedding (2006). From 2011 to 2014, Ruakere played the character of Roimata Ngatai on Shortland Street, her most notable television role to date. In 2018, Ruakere was a contestant on Dancing with the Stars''. Although making it to the Grand Final, she and dancing partner Enrique Johns were first of the four teams to be eliminated. In 2022, she became the host of  New Zealand's edition of FBoy Island.

Filmography

Film

Television

References

External links
 

1978 births
Living people
New Zealand film actresses
New Zealand television actresses
New Zealand Māori actresses
New Zealand Māori people
People from Hāwera
New Zealand soap opera actresses
21st-century New Zealand actresses